Vézac may refer to the following places in France:

 Vézac, Cantal, a commune of the Cantal département
 Vézac, Dordogne, a commune of the Dordogne département